Turandot, Princess of China (French: Turandot, princesse de Chine) is a 1935 comedy film directed by Gerhard Lamprecht and Serge Véber and starring Käthe von Nagy, Pierre Blanchar and Marcel Dalio. It is the French language version of the German film Princess Turandot. Such multi-language versions were common during the first decade of sound.

The film's sets were designed by the art directors Robert Herlth and Walter Röhrig.

Cast
Käthe von Nagy as Turandot
Pierre Blanchar as Kalaf, the bird-dealer
Marcel Dalio as Hippolyte
Sinoël as The Emperor
José Noguéro as Prince of Samarkand
Monette Dinay as Mian-Li
Marfa d'Hervilly as The Empress
Rognoni aas the fruit dealer
André Berley as the judge
Julien Carette
Edouard Hamel
Katia Lova 
Philippe Richard

References

External links

1935 comedy films
German comedy films
Films of Nazi Germany
Films based on works by Friedrich Schiller
Films directed by Gerhard Lamprecht
Films directed by Serge Véber
German multilingual films
Films with screenplays by Thea von Harbou
UFA GmbH films
German black-and-white films
1935 multilingual films
1930s French-language films
Films based on works by Carlo Gozzi
Works based on Turandot (Gozzi)
1930s German films